Mikael Neville Anderson (born 1 July 1998) is an Icelandic professional footballer who plays as a winger for Danish Superliga club AGF.

Club career

FC Midtjylland
Anderson is a product of AGF, where he played before joining FC Midtjylland as U14 player. At the age of 14, he was invited to a trial at Aston Villa.

After a successful 2015–16 with the U19 squad, eight U19 players including Anderson was promoted to the first team squad. All of them was offered a full time professional contract. FCM offered him a five-year contract in August 2016, but Anderson did not want to sign it. Anderson revealed, that he did not wanted to tell what the problem was, but if the club couldn't accommodate his requirements. However, he signed the contract in October 2016. In November 2016, he went back from a six-month injury in his knee.

He made his professional debut in the Danish Superliga for Midtjylland on 4 December 2016 in a game against AGF.

On loan to Vendsyssel FF
On 31 August 2017, Anderson was loaned out to Vendsyssel FF in the Danish 1st Division for the rest of the season. He scored the winning goal in a 2–1 victory against Lyngby BK and secured a promotion to the Superliga for the first time in the club's history.

On loan to Excelsior
On 2 July 2018, Anderson was loaned out to Excelsior in the Eredivisie for the rest of the season.

Return to FC Midtjylland
Anderson returned to FC Midtjylland for the 2019–20 season and was called up for the first game of the Danish Superliga season against Esbjerg. Anderson started on the bench and came on the pitch in the 85th minute. He scored the match winning goal in the last minute which gave Midtjylland a 1–0 victory.

AGF
On 1 September 2021 AGF confirmed, that Anderson had returned to the club on a deal until June 2026.

International career
Mikael has represented both Iceland and Denmark internationally at youth levels. In late 2017 he decided to represent Iceland internationally. On 15 December 2017 he was called up to the senior Iceland squad for two friendlies against Indonesia in January 2018. On 4 June 2021, Mikael scored his first goal for Iceland in a 1–0 win against Faroe Islands.

Career statistics

Personal life
Mikael has an Icelandic mother and a Jamaican father. He also has Danish citizenship having been partially raised in the country.

References

External links
 
 
 
 

1998 births
Living people
Mikael Anderson
Mikael Anderson
Mikael Anderson
Mikael Anderson
Danish men's footballers
Denmark youth international footballers
Mikael Anderson
Mikael Anderson
Mikael Anderson
Association football wingers
Iceland under-21 international footballers
Danish people of Jamaican descent
Danish Superliga players
Danish 1st Division players
Eredivisie players
Aarhus Gymnastikforening players
FC Midtjylland players
Excelsior Rotterdam players
Vendsyssel FF players
Mikael Anderson
Mikael Anderson